Río de Oro is a town and municipality in the Colombian Department of Cesar.

References

External links
 Rio de Oro official website
 Gobernacion del Cesar, Rio de Oro

Municipalities of Cesar Department